LGJ may refer to:

 Bronx School for Law, Government and Justice, a high school in New York City, USA
 Loughborough Junction railway station, a station in south London, UK
 Lalgudi G Jayaraman, Indian violinist